Attahk is the seventh studio album by French rock band Magma, released on 5 March 1978. Its sound marks a noticeable shift from the sound of the band's previous albums, predominantly consisting of funk and jazz fusion music that incorporates elements of rhythm and blues, gospel, and pop music.

Magma had disbanded for a year after the release of their 1976 album Üdü Ẁüdü, before reuniting under the new musical direction, with a more accessible sound. Some songs on this album – such as "Rindë" - as well as some from Live/Hhaï (1975) and Üdü Ẁüdü – are incorporated into the compositions of the band's 2009 album Ëmëhntëhtt-Ré.

Track listing
All music written by Christian Vander.

Side one
 "The Last Seven Minutes (1970-1977, Phase I)" - 7:35
 "Spiritual (Negro Song)" - 3:17
 "Rindë (Eastern Song)" - 3:07
 "Liriïk Necronomicus Kahnt (in which our heroes Ürgon & Ğorğo Meet)" - 4:59

Side two
 "Maahnt (The Wizard's Fight Versus the Devil)" - 5:29
 "Dondaï (To an Eternal Love)" - 7:59
 "Nono (1978, Phase II)" - 6:17

Note: On the most recent release of the CD by Charly Records, track 2 is labelled as "Spiritual (Gospel)".

Personnel
 Klaus Blasquiz (Klotz) – vocals
 Rene Garber (Stundehr) – vocals
 Stella Vander (Thaud) – vocals
 Lisa Bois (Sïhnn) – vocals
 Tony Russo – trumpet
 Jacques Bolognesi – trombone
 Benoit Widemann (Kahal) – grand piano, Rhodes piano, Minimoog, Oberheim polyphonic synthesizer
 Guy Delacroix (Ürgon and Gorgo) – "Earth" bass, "Air" bass
 Christian Vander (Dëhrstün) – lead vocals, drums, percussion, grand piano, Rhodes piano, Chamberlin
with
 Laurent Thibault – production, engineering
 Michel Marie – assistant
 H. R. Giger – cover illustration

References

External links
 Attahk at www.seventhrecords.com

1978 albums
Albums with cover art by H. R. Giger
Funk albums by French artists
Jazz fusion albums by French artists
Magma (band) albums